Cornelia Lister (born 26 May 1994) is a former Swedish tennis player.

Lister won one singles title and 25 doubles titles on the ITF Women's Circuit. On 7 May 2018, she reached a career-high singles ranking of world No. 383. On 3 February 2020, she peaked at No. 72 in the doubles rankings.

Doubles performance timeline

WTA career finals

Doubles: 1 (title)

WTA 125 tournament finals

Doubles: 2 (2 runner-ups)

ITF finals

Singles: 4 (1 title, 3 runner–ups)

Doubles: 40 (25 titles, 15 runner–ups)

External links
 
 
 

1994 births
Living people
Swedish female tennis players
Sportspeople from Linköping
Sportspeople from Östergötland County
20th-century Swedish women
21st-century Swedish women